B-Sides & Rarities is a compilation album by Seven Mary Three.  It was released in 1997 by Atlantic/Mammoth Records for promotional use only.  It was available free with some copies of their second studio album called RockCrown.

Track listing
All songs written by Seven Mary Three.
"Shelf Life" – 4:35
"Blackwing" – 3:58
"Lame" (Acoustic/Electric) – 5:01
"My My" (Live) – 3:16
"Home Stretch" (Acoustic) – 4:12
"Water's Edge" (Live) – 5:37
"Lucky" – 4:33
"Cumbersome" (Acoustic) – 3:55 (Hidden track appearing at 6:33-10:28 of Track 7)
"Cumbersome" (Acoustic with drums) – 3:55 (Hidden track appearing at 14:33-18:28 of Track 7)

Album credits
Jason Ross – lead vocals, rhythm guitar
Jason Pollock – lead guitar, backing vocals
Casey Daniel – bass
Giti Khalsa – drums
Robbie Gennett – keyboards (Track 5)
Kevin McKendree – keyboards (Tracks 6 & 7)

Production
Producers: Tom Morris, Jason Pollock, and Jason Ross (except Track 4 produced by Cathy Irving and Todd Fraracci)
Engineering: Rob Selmanovic (Track 4)
Mastering: Tom Morris

Seven Mary Three albums
B-side compilation albums
1997 compilation albums
Atlantic Records compilation albums